The Alliance Theatre is a theater company in Atlanta, Georgia, based at the Alliance Theatre, part of the Robert W. Woodruff Arts Center, and is the winner of the 2007 Regional Theatre Tony Award. The company, originally the Atlanta Municipal Theatre, staged its first production (King Arthur) at the Alliance in 1968. The following year the company became the Alliance Theatre Company.

Within a decade, the company had grown tremendously and staged the world premiere of Tennessee Williams' Tiger Tail and was casting such well-known actors as Richard Dreyfuss, Morgan Freeman, Jane Alexander, Paul Winfield, Robert Foxworth, Jo Van Fleet and Cybill Shepherd. Other world premieres included Ed Graczyk's Come Back to the Five and Dime, Jimmy Dean, Jimmy Dean.

With the arrival of Kenny Leon as artistic director in 1988, the company began a period of diversification and growth. Leon's work attracted a larger African-American audience by staging a more diverse selection of productions. During Leon's tenure, the company staged premieres of Pearl Cleage's Blues for an Alabama Sky, Alfred Uhry's The Last Night of Ballyhoo, and Elton John and Tim Rice's musical Aida which went on to Broadway and won the Tony award for Best Original Musical Score. When Leon resigned from the company in 2000, Susan V. Booth became artistic director. Under her direction, the company produced the Broadway-bound production of the musical The Color Purple, and in 2007 presented Sister Act the Musical. More recent Alliance musical premieres to transfer to Broadway include Bring It On: The Musical, Tuck Everlasting, and The Prom. 

The Alliance Theatre offers 10 productions annually, with performances in the 770-seat Alliance Stage and the 200-seat Hertz Stage (formerly Studio Theatre), as well as Theatre for Young Audiences offerings. In June 2022, the venue staged the premiere of "Trading Places: The Musical!" directed by Leon and written by Thomas Lennon.

References

External links
Alliance Theatre official website
 
Encore Atlanta, the official show program of the Alliance Theatre

Performing groups established in 1968
Theatre in Atlanta
League of Resident Theatres
Regional theatre in the United States
Theatre companies in Georgia (U.S. state)
Tony Award winners